Jardin Massey is a public garden in Tarbes, France built in the 19th century by  (1777-1853), horticulturist of the French King Louis Philippe I and previous chief of the Palace of Versailles' gardens.

The Jardin Massey has been put on the list of the Remarkable Gardens of France by the French government in 2004.

The garden contains several interesting buildings such as: 
the orangery,
the cloister (bought from the abbey of Saint-Sever-de-Rustan),
the School of art and ceramics.

The garden also contains rare or interesting trees, flowers, and animals.

External links

 Tarbes' City Hall webpage of the Massey garden 
 Tarbes' Tourism Office webpage 

Massey
Parks in France
Urban public parks